Zeuzera nepalense is a moth in the family Cossidae. It was described by Franz Daniel in 1962. It is found in Nepal.

References

Zeuzerinae
Moths described in 1962